The 2016 Tercera División play-offs to Segunda División B from Tercera División (Promotion play-offs) were the final playoffs for the promotion from 2015–16 Tercera División to 2016–17 Segunda División B. The first four teams in each group took part in the play-off.

Format
The eighteen group winners have the opportunity to be promoted directly to Segunda División B. The eighteen group winners were drawn into a two-legged series where the nine winners will promote to Segunda División B. The nine losing clubs will enter the play-off round for the last nine promotion spots.

The eighteen runners-up were drawn against one of the eighteen fourth-placed clubs outside their group and the eighteen third-placed clubs were drawn against one another in a two-legged series. The twenty-seven winners will advance with the nine losing clubs from the champions' series to determine the eighteen teams that will enter the last two-legged series for the last nine promotion spots. In all the playoff series, the lower-ranked club play at home first. Whenever there is a tie in position (e.g. like the group winners in the champions' series or the third-placed teams in the first round), a draw determines the club to play at home first.

Group Winners promotion play-off

Qualified teams 
The draw took place in the RFEF headquarters, in Las Rozas (Madrid) on 16 May 2016.

Matches

|}

Non-champions promotion play-off

First round

Qualified teams

Matches
The draw took place in the RFEF headquarters, in Las Rozas (Madrid), on 16 May 2016. The first leg was played on 22 and 23 May 2016 and the second one on 28 and 29 May.

|}

Second round

Qualified teams
The draw was held in the RFEF headquarters, in Las Rozas (Madrid).

Matches
The draw took place in the RFEF headquarters, in Las Rozas (Madrid), on 30 May 2016. The first leg will be played on 4 and 5 June 2016 and the second one on 11 and 12 June.

|}

Third round

Qualified teams

Matches
The draw took place in the RFEF headquarters, in Las Rozas (Madrid), on 13 June 2016. The first leg will be played on 18 and 19 June 2016 and the second one on 25 and 26 June.

|}

See also
2016 Segunda División play-offs
2016 Segunda División B play-offs

References

External links
Playoffs at Futbolme

2015-16
play-offs
3